Biləyən (also, Bilağan) is a village and municipality in the Aghjabadi Rayon of Azerbaijan. It has a population of 697.

References

Populated places in Aghjabadi District